The Arden School of Theatre, also known as The Arden, is a drama school which is part of the Performing Arts faculty at UCEN Manchester in England, United Kingdom.

History
The school was founded jointly by the Royal Exchange Theatre and South Manchester College in 1991 by the senior curriculum manager Robert S. Ely, to provide vocational degree level theatrical education in the North of England, one of the first to provide theatrical degrees in the United Kingdom. The name derived from the original City College Arden Campus where the drama school had been based between 1991 and 2004, in Northenden, South Manchester. It has never been a member of the Conference of Drama Schools.

In 2006, The Arden moved into new premises located over three floors at Universal Square. In September 2010 The Arden moved into Nicholls House, Ardwick, Manchester, a renovated Victorian building with additional rehearsal space, production rooms, and voice and singing rooms.

The college is a founder member of the  National Skills Academy for Creative & Cultural Skills.

Facilities
The programmes utilise a dedicated theatre space at The Waterside Theatre, attached to the Manchester College Shena Simon Campus, Whitworth Street, in central Manchester. Collaboration with other College degree programmes allows access to other specialist facilities including music recording studios and radio studio and film and television production equipment.

In September 2022 The Arden moved into a new campus located opposite the AO Arena near Manchester City Centre; a newly built campus for UCEN Manchester courses. The facilities include a squared studio theatre, two theatre spaces, a wardrobe area and costume design/build workshop, a fully equipped music studio, rehearsal rooms, drama studios, ensemble rooms, singing rooms, small film studio, classrooms, band rehearsal rooms, practice rooms, state of the art recording studios and live rooms.

Courses and faculty
The school provides five BA (Hons) programmes, validated by Sheffield Hallam University in Acting (Paul Broughton), Dance and Performance (Belinda Grantham), Musical Theatre (Will Nelson), Theatre and Performance (Wayne Steven Jackson), and Vocal Studies (Andrew Stephenson).

The Arden teaching faculty includes theatre professionals such as musical director Robert Purvis and actor/composer Graham Lappin, television and film actors Marie Critchley, and Paul Broughton, dancers Belinda Grantham and Tomas Simon, and performance makers Wayne Steven Jackson and Graham Hicks.

The college has a wide range of relationships locally with the Contact Theatre and the Royal Exchange Theatre. Graduates ahowcases are presented each year both in the region and in London, with a number of casting agents for acting, dance, and musical theatre.

Alumni
Graduates of the school include:

 Zöe Lucker - actress: Footballers' Wives, HolbyBlue, EastEnders

 Tracy Shaw - actress: Coronation Street
 Cherylee Houston - actress Coronation Street
 Kim Tiddy - actress Hollyoaks
 Shaun Dooley- Actor: The Woman in Black, The Awakening, 
Saoirse-Monica Jackson - actress, Derry Girls'' 
Ella Straub - Actress
Kim Tiddy - Actress

References

City College Manchester
Education in Manchester
Drama schools in the United Kingdom
Educational institutions established in 1991
1991 establishments in England
Contemporary theatre
Contemporary dance in the United Kingdom